The Lost Café is a 2018 Nigerian drama film directed by Kenneth Gyang and produced by Regina Idu Udalor. The film stars Tunde Aladese and Anders Lidin Hansen with Jenny Bonden, Tayo Citadel, and Anita Daniels in supporting roles. The film tells the story about a Nigerian graduate student who moved to Norway to study to become a film director, where she met an elderly man with secrets.

The film was released through Netflix on 31 July 2020 which is the Netflix debut for Regina Udalor. The film received mostly positive critics acclaim and screened worldwide. In 2018 at the Africa Movie Academy Awards, the film was nominated for seven awards: Achievement in Screenplay, Best Actress in a Leading Role, Best Director, Best Film, Best Nigerian Film, Achievement in Cinematography and Achievement in Sound.

Cast
 Tunde Aladese as Ose
 Anders Lidin Hansen as Eirik
 Jenny Bonden as Sunniva
 Tayo Citadel as Young Thorkell
 Anita Daniels as Dora
 Silje Drengsrud as Lene
 Belinda Effah as Efe
 Ingrid Lill Høgtun as Sunniva's Mother
 Torbjørn Jensen as Coffee Shop Owner / Librarian
 Terje Bruun Lien as Old Man Thorkell (as Terje Lien)
 Marianne Lindbeck as Young Thorkell's Girlfriend
 Anne Njemanze as Ose's Mother
 Carla Nyquist as Lecturer
 Thorkell August Ottarsson as Hod
 Omatta Udalor as Hakeem

References

External links 
 

Nigerian drama films
2018 films
2018 drama films